Coastal Forces was a division of the Royal Navy established during World War II. It consisted of small coastal defence craft such as Motor Launches, submarine chasers, air-sea rescue launches, Motor Gun Boats and Motor Torpedo Boats. It did not include minesweepers, trawlers or landing craft. This article is about the equivalent boats used by the Royal Australian Navy (RAN).

Units and craft
It included the following types of coastal defence craft:

31 Harbour Defence Motor Launches (HDMLs) and 35 Fairmile B Motor Launches entered service from October 1942. They were employed on routine patrols, convoy escorts, running special forces in and out of Japanese-held areas, boom defence patrols in harbours at home and abroad, courier operations, survey work, and raiding Japanese-held coasts.

RAN HDMLs

RAN Fairmiles
A Fairmile school was established at HMAS Rushcutter on 1 June 1942. The first Australian Fairmile, ML 813, entered service at the end of that year. Originally designed in the UK for coastal anti-submarine and convoy duties, the RAN Fairmiles performed these and a variety of other functions. Their tasks included convoy escort, servicing and supporting advancing troops, landing and recovering commandos and coastwatchers, rescuing civilians from enemy occupied territories, and invasion escort.

Surviving craft
One Fairmile survives as Challenger 1, based in Melbourne for charter.  It went to Fremantle in 1962, then to Gold Coast in 1977.  It was upgraded there with a more-upmarket fitout.  The previous east-coast survivor was an ex Roylen Cruises fairmile, Roylen Sandra which sank in a creek at Ingham in 2010. The fate of second last to stay afloat was ex HML 815 which became Roylen Pataj (named after the son and grandson of the operators of Roylen Cruises, Peter with the last letters of AJAX as it was known) this sank Rendova Island in the Solomon Islands and was later raised and sunk again near Kennedy Island near Gizo as dive site by the local scuba diving company. Petaj was fitted out as a luxury cruiser and was also used to ferry HRH Prince Charles around the Barrier Reef in 1965 before being acquired by Roylen Cruises.

See also
Coastal Forces of the Royal Navy
Coastal Forces of the Royal Canadian Navy
Coastal Forces of the Royal New Zealand Navy
 Coastal Forces of World War II

References

Further reading

External links
Australian Navy HDML 1323
Australian Navy HDML 1347
HMAS Koopa – Fairmile mother ship

Military units and formations of Australia in World War II
Military units and formations of the Royal Australian Navy